
Gmina Pępowo is a rural gmina (administrative district) in Gostyń County, Greater Poland Voivodeship, in west-central Poland.

Villages
Gmina Pępowo contains the villages and settlements of Babkowice, Czeluścin, Czeluścinek, Gębice, Kościuszkowo, Krzekotowice, Krzyżanki, Ludwinowo, Magdalenki, Pasierby, Pępowo, Siedlec, Skoraszewice and Wilkonice.

Neighbouring gminas
Gmina Pępowo is bordered by the gminas of Jutrosin, Kobylin, Krobia, Miejska Górka, Piaski and Pogorzela.

References
Polish official population figures 2006

Pepowo
Gostyń County